Pétria is a Charleroi Metro station, located in Fontaine-l'Évêque, in fare zone 7. It is a surface station featuring a central platform with street access at its eastern end. When the future line 3 opens, Pétria will become the terminus of line 2.

Pétria is the last Pre-metro type station on the Anderlues line, as the line becomes a standard tram line west of the station (toward Anderlues).

Nearby points of interest 
 Terril du Pétria, a Spoil tip classified as a nature reserve.

Transfers 
TEC Charleroi bus line 63.

Charleroi Metro stations
Railway stations opened in 1986

1986 establishments in Belgium